"Energy" (stylized in all caps) is a song by American singer Beyoncé featuring Jamaican rapper Beam. It is the fifth track on Knowles' seventh studio album Renaissance (2022), which was released on July 29, 2022, through Parkwood and Columbia. The song serves as an interlude between "Cuff It" and "Break My Soul".

Controversy
American singer and songwriter Kelis, whose 2003 single "Milkshake" was interpolated on Renaissance track "Energy", criticized Beyoncé for not notifying her in advance, calling its use a "theft" and saying that she felt "disrespect and utter ignorance" were displayed both by Beyoncé and by Pharrell Williams and Chad Hugo of the Neptunes. Both Williams and Hugo were credited on "Energy" for writing and producing "Milkshake". The interpolation of "Milkshake" was later removed from the song on streaming services following Kelis' unhappiness about not being notified about the use of "Milkshake" in "Energy". Kelis subsequently stated that she was "actually [happy]" with that outcome. Other artists who were sampled on the album thanked Beyoncé for referencing their contributions, particularly emphasizing the album's role in honoring Black queer and trans culture. They include Ts Madison, whose viral video clip "Bitch, I'm Black" is sampled on "Cozy"; Robin S., whose 1990 house hit "Show Me Love" is credited on lead single "Break My Soul"; Kevin Aviance, whose song "Cunty" is sampled on "Pure/Honey"; and ballroom commentator Kevin JZ Prodigy, whose chants are borrowed from the 2009 DJ MikeQ track "Feels Like" on "Pure/Honey".

Critics reception 
Pitchfork critic Julianne Escobedo Shepherd wrote that lyrically the song is "minimal and onomatopoeic" and the words are "in service to the vibe, a melodic extension of percussion". Kyle Denis of Billboard found that it is "a support beam for neighboring songs, and still a grand ole time in its own right" thaks to "one of the most talked-about lyrics on the album" for the phrase "Cause them Karens just turned into terrorists". The Guardian writer Tara Joshi selected "Energy" as the example of the "flow as a continuous mix" of the album.

Commercial performance
After the release of Renaissance, "Energy" debuted on the Billboard Hot 100 chart at number 27 and on the Hot R&B/Hip-Hop Songs chart at number 12.

Personnel and credits

Samples
 contains an interpolation of "Ooh La La La", written by Mary Brockert and Allen McGrier and performed by Teena Marie
 contains a sample of "Explode", written by Freddie Ross and Adam Piggot and performed by Big Freedia.
 contains an interpolation of "Milkshake", written by Pharrell Williams and Chad Hugo and performed by Kelis (later removed on digital and streaming versions).

Recording locations
 The Juicy Juicy (Los Angeles, California)
 Kings Landing West (Los Angeles, California)
 Parkwood West (Los Angeles, California)

Personnel
Performers
 Vocals by Beyoncé and Beam
 Additional vocals by Big Freedia
 Beam – drums
 Al Cres – drums
 NovaWav – additional synths
 Skrillex – drums

Technical credits
 Beam – production
 Beyoncé – production, vocal production
 Matheus Braz – assistant engineering
 Chi Coney – engineering
 Al Cres – production
 John Cranfield – engineering
 Brandon Harding – engineering
 NovaWav – additional production
 Andrea Roberts – engineering
 Skrillex – production
 Stuart White – mixing, recording

Charts

References

2022 songs
Beyoncé songs
Sampling controversies
Songs written by Beyoncé
Songs written by Chad Hugo
Songs written by Pharrell Williams
Songs written by Skrillex
Songs written by The-Dream
Song recordings produced by Beyoncé
Song recordings produced by Skrillex